

Events

Pre-1600
48 BC – Pompey disembarks at Pelusium upon arriving in Egypt, whereupon he is assassinated by order of King Ptolemy XIII.
 235 – Pope Pontian resigns. He is exiled to the mines of Sardinia, along with Hippolytus of Rome.
 351 – Constantius II defeats the usurper Magnentius.
365 – Roman usurper Procopius bribes two legions passing by Constantinople, and proclaims himself emperor.
 935 – Duke Wenceslaus I of Bohemia is murdered by a group of nobles led by his brother Boleslaus I, who succeeds him.
 995 – Boleslaus II, Duke of Bohemia, kills most members of the rival Slavník dynasty.
1066 – William the Conqueror lands in England, beginning the Norman conquest.
1106 – King Henry I of England defeats his brother Robert Curthose at the Battle of Tinchebray.
1238 – King James I of Aragon conquers Valencia from the Moors. Shortly thereafter, he proclaims himself king of Valencia.
1322 – Louis IV, Holy Roman Emperor, defeats Frederick I of Austria in the Battle of Mühldorf.
1538 – Ottoman–Venetian War: The Ottoman Navy scores a decisive victory over a Holy League fleet in the Battle of Preveza.
1542 – Juan Rodríguez Cabrillo of Portugal arrives at what is now San Diego, California. He is the first European in California.

1601–1900
1779 – American Revolution: Samuel Huntington is elected President of the Continental Congress, succeeding John Jay.
1781 – American Revolution: French and American forces backed by a French fleet begin the siege of Yorktown.
1787 – The Congress of the Confederation votes to send the newly written United States Constitution to the state legislatures for approval.
1821 – The Declaration of Independence of the Mexican Empire is drafted. It will be made public on 13 October.
1844 – Oscar I of Sweden–Norway is crowned king of Sweden.
1867 – Toronto becomes the capital of Ontario, having also been the capital of Ontario's predecessors since 1796.
1868 – The Battle of Alcolea causes Queen Isabella II of Spain to flee to France.
1871 – The Brazilian Parliament passes a law that frees all children thereafter born to slaves, and all government-owned slaves.
1889 – The General Conference on Weights and Measures (CGPM) defines the length of a metre.
1892 – The first night game for American football takes place in a contest between Wyoming Seminary and Mansfield State Normal.
1893 – Foundation of the Portuguese football club FC Porto.

1901–present
1901 – Philippine–American War: Filipino guerrillas kill more than forty American soldiers while losing 28 of their own.
1912 – The Ulster Covenant is signed by some 500,000 Ulster Protestant Unionists in opposition to the Third Irish Home Rule Bill.
  1912   – Corporal Frank S. Scott of the United States Army becomes the first enlisted man to die in an airplane crash.
1918 – World War I: The Fifth Battle of Ypres begins.
1919 – Race riots begin in Omaha, Nebraska.
1924 – The first aerial circumnavigation is completed by a team from the US Army. 
1928 – Alexander Fleming notices a bacteria-killing mold growing in his laboratory, discovering what later became known as penicillin.
1939 – World War II: Nazi Germany and the Soviet Union agree on a division of Poland.
  1939   – World War II: The siege of Warsaw comes to an end.
1941 – World War II: The Drama uprising against the Bulgarian occupation in northern Greece begins.
  1941   – Ted Williams achieves a .406 batting average for the season, and becomes the last major league baseball player to bat .400 or better.
1944 – World War II: Soviet Army troops liberate Klooga concentration camp in Estonia.
1951 – CBS makes the first color televisions available for sale to the general public, but the product is discontinued less than a month later.
1961 – A military coup in Damascus effectively ends the United Arab Republic, the union between Egypt and Syria.
1970 – Egyptian President Gamal Abdel Nasser dies of a heart attack in Cairo.
1973 – The ITT Building in New York City is bombed in protest at ITT's alleged involvement in the coup d'état in Chile.
1975 – The Spaghetti House siege, in which nine people are taken hostage, takes place in London.
1986 – The Democratic Progressive Party becomes the first opposition party in Taiwan.
1992 – A Pakistan International Airlines flight crashes into a hill in Nepal, killing all 167 passengers and crew.
1994 – The cruise ferry  sinks in the Baltic Sea, killing 852 people.
1995 – Bob Denard and a group of mercenaries take the islands of the Comoros in a coup.
  1995   – Israeli Prime Minister Yitzhak Rabin and PLO Chairman Yasser Arafat sign the Interim Agreement on the West Bank and the Gaza Strip.
2000 – Al-Aqsa Intifada: Ariel Sharon visits Al-Aqsa Mosque known to Jews as the Temple Mount in Jerusalem.
2008 – Falcon 1 becomes the first privately developed liquid-fuel ground-launched vehicle to put a payload into orbit by the RatSat mission.
  2008   – The Singapore Grand Prix is held as Formula One's inaugural night race, with Fernando Alonso winning the event. Almost a year later it was revealed that Alonso's team-mate Nelson Piquet Jr. had been ordered to crash his car to help bring out the safety car and give Alonso the advantage and win.
2009 – The military junta leading Guinea attacks a protest rally, killing or wounding 1,400 people.
2012 – Somali and African Union forces launch a coordinated assault on the Somali port of Kismayo to take back the city from al-Shabaab militants.
2014 – The 2014 Hong Kong protests begin in response to restrictive political reforms imposed by the NPC in Beijing.
2016 – The 2016 South Australian blackout occurs, lasting up to three days in some areas.
2018 – The 7.5 Mw 2018 Sulawesi earthquake, which triggered a large tsunami, leaves 4,340 dead and 10,679 injured.

Births

Pre-1600
551 BC – Confucius, Chinese teacher, editor, politician, and philosopher of the Spring and Autumn period of Chinese history. (d. 479 BC)
 616 – Javanshir, King of Caucasian Albania (d. 680)
1494 – Agnolo Firenzuola, Italian poet and playwright (d. 1545)
1555 – Henri de La Tour d'Auvergne, Marshal of France (d. 1623)
1573 – Théodore de Mayerne, Swiss physician (d. 1654)

1601–1900
1605 – Ismaël Bullialdus, French astronomer and mathematician (d. 1694)
1681 – Johann Mattheson, German composer, lexicographer, and diplomat (d. 1764)
1705 – Henry Fox, 1st Baron Holland, English politician, Secretary of State for the Southern Department (d. 1774)
  1705   – Johann Peter Kellner, German organist and composer (d. 1772)
1735 – Augustus FitzRoy, 3rd Duke of Grafton, English academic and politician, Prime Minister of the United Kingdom (d. 1811)
1746 – William Jones, English-Welsh philologist and scholar (d. 1794)
1765 – Frederick Christian II, Duke of Schleswig-Holstein-Sonderburg-Augustenburg (d. 1814)
1803 – Prosper Mérimée, French archaeologist, historian, and author (d. 1870)
1809 – Alvan Wentworth Chapman, American physician and botanist (d. 1899)
1819 – Narcís Monturiol, Spanish engineer and publisher (d. 1885)
1821 – Jonathan Clarkson Gibbs, American minister and politician (d. 1874)
1823 – Alexandre Cabanel, French painter and educator (d. 1889)
1824 – Francis Turner Palgrave, English poet and critic (d. 1897)
1836 – Thomas Crapper, English plumber, invented the ballcock (d. 1910)
1841 – Georges Clemenceau, French journalist, physician, and politician, 85th Prime Minister of France (d. 1929)
1844 – Robert Stout, Scottish-New Zealand lawyer and politician, 13th Prime Minister of New Zealand (d. 1930)
1852 – Henri Moissan, French chemist and academic, Nobel Prize laureate (d. 1907)
  1852   – Isis Pogson, British astronomer and meteorologist (d. 1945)
1856 – Kate Douglas Wiggin, American author and educator (d. 1923)
1860 – Paul Ulrich Villard, French chemist and physicist (d. 1934)
1861 – Amélie of Orléans, queen consort of Portugal (d. 1951)
1867 – Hiranuma Kiichirō, Japanese lawyer and politician, 35th Prime Minister of Japan (d. 1952)
  1867   – James Edwin Campbell, American educator, school administrator, newspaper editor, poet, and essayist (d. 1896)
1870 – Florent Schmitt, French composer and critic (d. 1958)
1877 – Albert Young, American boxer and promoter (d. 1940)
1878 – Joseph Ruddy, American swimmer and water polo player (d. 1962)
1881 – Pedro de Cordoba, American actor (d. 1950)
1882 – Mart Saar, Estonian organist and composer (d. 1963)
1885 – Emil Väre, Finnish wrestler, coach, and referee (d. 1974)
1887 – Avery Brundage, American businessman, 5th President of the International Olympic Committee (d. 1975)
1889 – Jack Fournier, American baseball player and coach (d. 1973)
1890 – Florence Violet McKenzie, Australian electrical engineer (d. 1982)
1892 – Elmer Rice, American playwright (d. 1967)
1893 – Hilda Geiringer, Austrian mathematician (d. 1973)
  1893   – Giannis Skarimpas, Greek author, poet, and playwright (d. 1984)
1898 – Carl Clauberg, German Nazi physician (d. 1957)
1900 – Isabel Pell, American socialite, fought as part of the French Resistance during WWII (d. 1951)

1901–present
1901 – William S. Paley, American broadcaster, founded CBS (d. 1990)
  1901   – Ed Sullivan, American television host (d. 1974)
1903 – Haywood S. Hansell, American general (d. 1988)
1905 – Max Schmeling, German boxer (d. 2005)
1907 – Heikki Savolainen, Finnish gymnast and physician (d. 1997)
  1907   – Bhagat Singh, Indian activist (d. 1931)
1909 – Al Capp, American author and illustrator (d. 1979)
1910 – Diosdado Macapagal, Filipino lawyer and politician, 9th President of the Philippines (d. 1997)
  1910   – Wenceslao Vinzons, Filipino lawyer and politician (d. 1942)
1913 – Warja Honegger-Lavater, Swiss illustrator (d. 2007)
  1913   – Alice Marble, American tennis player (d. 1990)
1914 – Maria Franziska von Trapp, Austrian-American refugee and singer (d. 2014)
1915 – Ethel Rosenberg, American spy (d. 1953)
1916 – Peter Finch, English-Australian actor (d. 1977)
  1916   – Olga Lepeshinskaya, Ukrainian-Russian ballerina and educator (d. 2008)
1917 – Wee Chong Jin, Singaporean judge (d. 2005)
1918 – Ángel Labruna, Argentinian footballer and manager (d. 1983)
  1918   – Arnold Stang, American actor (d. 2009)
1919 – Doris Singleton, American actress (d. 2012)
1922 – Larry Munson, American sportscaster (d. 2011)
  1922   – Jules Sedney, Prime Minister of Suriname (d. 2020)
1923 – Tuli Kupferberg, American singer, poet, and writer (d. 2010)
  1923   – John Scott, 9th Duke of Buccleuch, Scottish captain and politician, Lord Lieutenant of Selkirkshire (d. 2007)
  1923   – William Windom, American actor (d. 2012)
1924 – Rudolf Barshai, Russian-Swiss viola player and conductor (d. 2010)
  1924   – Marcello Mastroianni, Italian-French actor and singer (d. 1996)
1925 – Seymour Cray, American computer scientist, founded the CRAY Computer Company (d. 1996)
  1925   – Cromwell Everson, South African composer (d. 1991)
  1925   – Martin David Kruskal, American physicist and mathematician (d. 2006)
1926 – Jerry Clower, American soldier, comedian, and author (d. 1998)
1928 – Koko Taylor, American singer (d. 2009)
1929 – Lata Mangeshkar, Indian playback singer and composer (d. 2022)
1930 – Tommy Collins, American country music singer-songwriter (d. 2000)
  1930   – Immanuel Wallerstein, American sociologist, author, and academic (d. 2019)
1932 – Jeremy Isaacs, Scottish screenwriter and producer
  1932   – Víctor Jara, Chilean singer-songwriter, poet, and director (d. 1973)
1933 – Joe Benton, English soldier and politician
  1933   – Miguel Ortiz Berrocal, Spanish sculptor and educator (d. 2006)
  1933   – Johnny "Country" Mathis, American singer-songwriter  (d. 2011)
1934 – Brigitte Bardot, French actress 
1935 – Bruce Crampton, Australian golfer
  1935   – David Hannay, Baron Hannay of Chiswick, English diplomat, British Permanent Representative to the United Nations
  1935   – Ronald Lacey, English actor (d. 1991)
1936 – Emmett Chapman, American guitarist, invented the Chapman Stick (d. 2021)
  1936   – Eddie Lumsden, Australian rugby league player (d. 2019)
  1936   – Robert Wolders, Dutch television actor (d. 2018)
1937 – Alice Mahon, English trade union leader and politician
  1937   – Glenn Sutton,  American country music songwriter and record producer (d. 2007)
1938 – Ben E. King, American singer-songwriter and producer (d. 2015)
1939 – Stuart Kauffman, American biologist and academic
1941 – David Lewis, American philosopher and academic (d. 2001)
  1941   – Edmund Stoiber, German lawyer and politician, Minister President of Bavaria
1942 – Pierre Clémenti, French actor, director, producer, and screenwriter (d. 1999)
  1942   – Edward "Little Buster" Forehand, American singer-songwriter and guitarist (d. 2006)
1943 – Warren Lieberfarb, American businessman
  1943   – George W. S. Trow, American novelist, playwright, and critic (d. 2006)
  1943   – Nick St. Nicholas, German-Canadian bass player
1944 – Richie Karl, American golfer
  1944   – Marcia Muller, American journalist and author
1945 – Marielle Goitschel, French skier
  1945   – Manolis Rasoulis, Greek singer-songwriter and journalist (d. 2011)
  1945   – Fusako Shigenobu, Japanese activist, founded the Japanese Red Army
1946 – Tom Bower, English journalist and author
  1946   – Majid Khan, Indian-Pakistani cricketer
1947 – Bob Carr, Australian journalist and politician, 37th Australian Minister of Foreign Affairs
  1947   – Sheikh Hasina, Bangladeshi politician, 10th Prime Minister of Bangladesh
  1947   – Jon Snow, English journalist and academic
  1947   – Rhonda Hughes, American mathematician and academic
1949 – Jim Henshaw, Canadian actor, producer, and screenwriter
1950 – Paul Burgess, English drummer
  1950   – Christina Hoff Sommers, American author and philosopher
  1950   – John Sayles, American novelist, director, and screenwriter
1951 – Jim Diamond, Scottish singer-songwriter and musician (d. 2015)
1952 – Christopher Buckley, American satirical novelist
  1952   – Efthimis Kioumourtzoglou, Greek basketball player and coach
  1952   – Sylvia Kristel, Dutch model and actress (d. 2012)
  1952   – Andy Ward, English drummer 
1953 – Otmar Hasler, Liechtensteiner educator and politician, 11th Prime Minister of Liechtenstein
1954 – Steve Largent, American football player and politician
  1954   – George Lynch, American guitarist and songwriter 
  1954   – John Scott, English rugby player
  1954   – Margot Wallström, Swedish politician and diplomat, 42nd Swedish Minister for Foreign Affairs
1955 – Stéphane Dion, Canadian sociologist and politician, 15th Canadian Minister of the Environment
  1955   – Mercy Manci, Xhosa sangoma and HIV activist from South Africa
  1955   – Kenny Kirkland, American pianist (d. 1998)
1956 – Martha Isabel Fandiño Pinilla, Colombian-Italian mathematician and author
1957 – Bill Cassidy, American politician and physician
1959 – Ron Fellows, Canadian race car driver
  1959   – Laura Bruce, American artist
1960 – Gary Ayres, Australian footballer and coach
  1960   – Tom Byrum, American golfer
  1960   – Frank Hammerschlag, German footballer and manager
  1960   – Gus Logie, Trinidadian cricketer
  1960   – Kamlesh Patel, Baron Patel of Bradford, English politician
  1960   – Jennifer Rush, American singer-songwriter 
  1960   – Socrates Villegas, Filipino archbishop
1961 – Helen Grant, English lawyer and politician, Minister for Sport and the Olympics
  1961   – Gregory Jbara, American actor and singer
  1961   – Quentin Kawānanakoa, American lawyer and politician
  1961   – Anne White, American tennis player
1962 – Grant Fuhr, Canadian ice hockey player and coach
  1962   – Laurie Rinker, American golfer
  1962   – Dietmar Schacht, German footballer and manager
  1962   – Chuck Taylor, American journalist
1963 – Steve Blackman, American wrestler and martial artist
  1963   – Érik Comas, French race car driver
  1963   – Greg Weisman, American voice actor, producer, and screenwriter
1964 – Claudio Borghi, Argentinian footballer and manager
  1964   – Gregor Fisken, Scottish race car driver
  1964   – Janeane Garofalo, American comedian, actress, and screenwriter
  1964   – Paul Jewell, English footballer and manager
  1964   – Mārtiņš Roze, Latvian lawyer and politician (d. 2012)
1966 – Scott Adams, American football player (d. 2013)
  1966   – Maria Canals-Barrera, Cuban-American actress
  1966   – Puri Jagannadh, Indian director, producer, and screenwriter
1967 – Mira Sorvino, American actress
  1967   – Moon Zappa, American actress and author 
1968 – Francois Botha, South African boxer and mixed martial artist
  1968   – Mika Häkkinen, Finnish race car driver
  1968   – Trish Keenan, English singer-songwriter and guitarist (d. 2011)
  1968   – Sean Levert, American R&B singer-songwriter and actor (d. 2008)
  1968   – Rob Moroso, American race car driver (d. 1990)
  1968   – Naomi Watts, English-Australian actress and producer
1969 – Kerri Chandler, electronic music producer and DJ 
  1969   – Marcel Dost, Dutch decathlete
  1969   – Ben Greenman, American journalist and author
  1969   – Piper Kerman, American author and memoirist 
  1969   – Éric Lapointe, Canadian singer-songwriter and keyboard player
  1969   – Sascha Maassen, German race car driver
  1969   – Angus Robertson, Scottish politician
  1969   – Nico Vaesen, Belgian footballer
1970 – Kimiko Date-Krumm, Japanese tennis player
  1970   – Mike DeJean, American baseball player
  1970   – Gualter Salles, Brazilian race car driver
1971 – Joseph Arthur, American singer-songwriter and guitarist 
  1971   – George Eustice, English lawyer and politician
  1971   – Braam van Straaten, South African rugby player
  1971   – Alan Wright, English footballer and manager
1972 – Dita Von Teese, American model and dancer 
1973 – Brian Rafalski, American ice hockey player
1974 – Marco Di Loreto, Italian footballer and manager
  1974   – Mariya Kiselyova, Russian swimmer
  1974   – Joonas Kolkka, Finnish footballer and coach
  1974   – Shane Webcke, Australian rugby league player and coach
1975 – Stuart Clark, Australian cricketer and manager
  1975   – Isamu Jordan, American journalist and academic (d. 2013)
  1975   – Lenny Krayzelburg, Russian-American swimmer
1976 – Fedor Emelianenko, Russian mixed martial artist and politician
  1976   – Bonzi Wells, American basketball player
1977 – Ireneusz Marcinkowski, Polish footballer
  1977   – Pak Se-ri, South Korean golfer
  1977   – Young Jeezy, American rapper 
1978 – Ben Edmondson, Australian cricketer
1979 – Bam Margera, American skateboarder, actor, and stuntman
  1979   – Taki Tsan, American-Greek rapper and producer 
1980 – Marlon Parmer, American basketball player
1981 – Greg Anderson, American pianist and composer
  1981   – Willy Caballero, Argentine footballer
  1981   – José Calderón, Spanish basketball player
  1981   – Jorge Guagua, Ecuadorian footballer
  1981   – Iracema Trevisan, Brazilian bass player 
1982 – Aleksandr Anyukov, Russian footballer
  1982   – Abhinav Bindra, Indian target shooter
  1982   – Ray Emery, Canadian ice hockey player (d. 2018)
  1982   – Ranbir Kapoor, Indian actor and director
  1982   – Nolwenn Leroy, French singer-songwriter and actress
  1982   – Emeka Okafor, American basketball player
  1982   – Dustin Penner, Canadian ice hockey player
  1982   – Aivar Rehemaa, Estonian skier
  1982   – Anderson Varejão, Brazilian basketball player
  1982   – St. Vincent, American singer-songwriter and guitarist 
1983 – Stefan Moore, English footballer
  1983   – John Schwalger, New Zealand rugby player
1984 – Jenny Omnichord, Canadian singer-songwriter 
  1984   – Luke Pomersbach, Australian cricketer
  1984   – Naim Terbunja, Kosovan-Swedish boxer
  1984   – Melody Thornton, American singer-songwriter and dancer 
  1984   – Mathieu Valbuena, French footballer
  1984   – Ryan Zimmerman, American baseball player
1985 – Shindong, South Korean singer-songwriter and dancer 
  1985   – Alina Ibragimova, Russian-English violinist
1986 – Andrés Guardado, Mexican footballer
  1986   – Meskerem Legesse, Ethiopian runner (d. 2013)
  1986   – Dominic Waters,  American basketball player
1987 – Pierre Becken, German footballer
  1987   – Gary Deegan, Irish footballer
  1987   – Hilary Duff, American singer-songwriter and actress
  1987   – Chloë Hanslip, English violinist
  1987   – Viktoria Leks, Estonian high jumper
1988 – Marin Čilić, Croatian tennis player
  1988   – Esmée Denters, Dutch singer-songwriter
  1988   – Aleks Vrteski, Australian footballer
  1988   – Worakls, French DJ and electronic musician
1989 – Çağla Büyükakçay, Turkish tennis player
  1989   – Darius Johnson-Odom, American basketball player
  1989   – Mark Randall, English footballer
1990 – Phoenix Battye, Australian rugby player
1992 – Khem Birch, Canadian professional basketball player
1992 – Paula Ormaechea, Argentine tennis player
  1992   – Adam Thompson, English-Northern Irish footballer
  1992   – Kōko Tsurumi, Japanese gymnast
1993 – Jodie Williams, English sprinter
1995 – Jason Williams, English footballer
1996 – Aiden Moffat, British race car driver
1998 – Panna Udvardy, Hungarian tennis player
1999 – Kayla Day, American tennis player

Deaths

Pre-1600
48 BC – Pompey, Roman general and politician (b. 106 BC)
135 AD – Rabbi Akiva, Jewish sage, martyr. (b. c. 50)
 782 – Leoba, Anglo-Saxon nun (b. c. 710)
 935 – Wenceslaus I, duke of Bohemia (b. c. 907)
 980 – Minamoto no Hiromasa, Japanese nobleman (b. 918)
1197 – Henry VI, Holy Roman Emperor (b. 1165)
1213 – Gertrude of Merania, queen consort of Hungaria (b. 1185) 
1330 – Elizabeth of Bohemia, queen consort of Bohemia (b. 1292)
1429 – Cymburgis of Masovia, duchess consort of Austria (b. 1394)
1582 – George Buchanan, Scottish historian and scholar (b. 1506)
1596 – Margaret Clifford, countess of Derby (b. 1540)

1601–1900
1618 – Josuah Sylvester, English poet and translator (b. 1563)
1687 – Francis Turretin, Swiss-Italian theologian and academic (b. 1623)
1694 – Gabriel Mouton, French mathematician and theologian (b. 1618)
1702 – Robert Spencer, 2nd Earl of Sunderland, French-English lawyer and politician, Lord President of the Council (b. 1640)
1742 – Jean Baptiste Massillon, French bishop (b. 1663)
1805 – Christoph Franz von Buseck, Prince-Bishop of Bamberg (b. 1724)
1829 – Nikolay Raevsky, Russian general and politician (b. 1771)
1844 – Pyotr Aleksandrovich Tolstoy, Russian general and politician (b. 1769) 
1859 – Carl Ritter, German geographer and academic (b. 1779)
1873 – Émile Gaboriau, French journalist and author (b. 1832)
1891 – Herman Melville, American author and poet (b. 1819)
1893 – Annie Feray Mutrie, British painter (b. 1826)
1895 – Louis Pasteur, French chemist and microbiologist (b. 1822)
1899 – Giovanni Segantini, Austrian painter (b. 1858)

1901–present
1914 – Richard Warren Sears, American businessman, co-founded Sears (b. 1863)
1915 – Saitō Hajime, Japanese samurai (b. 1844)
1918 – Georg Simmel, German sociologist and philosopher (b. 1858)
  1918   – Freddie Stowers, American soldier, Medal of Honor recipient (b. 1896)
1920 – Yu Gwansun, Korean Independence Activist (b. 1902)
1925 – Paul Vermoyal, French actor (b. 1888) 
1935 – William Kennedy Dickson, French-Scottish actor, director, and producer, invented the Kinetoscope (b. 1860)
1938 – Charles Duryea, American engineer and businessman, founded the Duryea Motor Wagon Company  (b. 1861)
1941 – Marion Miley, American golfer, ranked No. 1 in the United States (b. 1914)
1943 – Sam Ruben, American chemist and academic (b. 1913)
  1943   – Filippo Illuminato, Italian partisan, Gold Medal of Military Valour (b. 1930)
1949 – Archbishop Chrysanthus of Athens (b. 1881)
1953 – Edwin Hubble, American astronomer and scholar (b. 1889)
1956 – William Boeing, American businessman, founded the Boeing Company (b. 1881)
1957 – Luis Cluzeau Mortet, Uruguayan violinist and composer (b. 1888)
1959 – Rudolf Caracciola, German race car driver (b. 1901)
1962 – Roger Nimier, French soldier and author (b. 1925)
1964 – Harpo Marx, American comedian, actor, and singer (b. 1888)
1966 – André Breton, French author and poet (b. 1896)
1970 – John Dos Passos, American novelist, poet, essayist, and playwright (b. 1896)
  1970   – Gamal Abdel Nasser, Egyptian colonel and politician, 2nd President of Egypt (b. 1918)
1978 – Pope John Paul I (b. 1912)
1979 – John Herbert Chapman, Canadian physicist and engineer (b. 1921)
1981 – Rómulo Betancourt, Venezuelan journalist and politician, President of Venezuela (b. 1908)
1982 – Mabel Albertson, American actress (b. 1901)
1984 – Cihad Baban, Turkish journalist, author, and politician (b. 1911)
1989 – Ferdinand Marcos, Filipino lawyer and politician, 10th President of the Philippines (b. 1917)
1990 – Larry O'Brien, American businessman and politician, 57th United States Postmaster General (b. 1917)
1991 – Miles Davis, American trumpet player, composer, and bandleader (b. 1926)
1993 – Peter De Vries, American editor and novelist  (b. 1910)
  1993   – Alexander A. Drabik, American sergeant (b. 1910)
1994 – Urmas Alender, Estonian singer (b. 1953)
  1994   – José Francisco Ruiz Massieu, Mexican lawyer and politician, 6th Governor of Guerrero (b. 1946)
  1994   – Harry Saltzman, Canadian production manager and producer (b. 1915)
  1994   – K. A. Thangavelu, Indian film actor and comedian (b. 1917)
1999 – Escott Reid, Canadian academic and diplomat (b. 1905)
2000 – Pierre Trudeau, Canadian journalist, lawyer, and politician, 15th Prime Minister of Canada (b. 1919)
2002 – Patsy Mink, American lawyer and politician (b. 1927)
  2002   – Hartland Molson, Canadian captain and politician (b. 1907)
2003 – Althea Gibson, American tennis player and golfer (b. 1927)
  2003   – Elia Kazan, American director, producer, and screenwriter (b. 1909)
  2003   – George Odlum, Saint Lucian politician and diplomat (b. 1934)
2004 – Geoffrey Beene, American fashion designer (b. 1924)
2005 – Constance Baker Motley, American lawyer, judge, and politician (b. 1921)
2007 – René Desmaison, French mountaineer (b. 1930)
  2007   – Wally Parks, American businessman, founded the National Hot Rod Association (b. 1913)
2009 – Guillermo Endara, Panamanian lawyer and politician, 32nd President of Panama (b. 1936)
  2009   – Ulf Larsson, Swedish actor and director (b. 1956)
2010 – Kurt Albert, German mountaineer and photographer (b. 1954)
  2010   – Arthur Penn, American director and producer (b. 1922)
  2010   – Dolores Wilson, American soprano and actress (b. 1928)
2012 – Avraham Adan, Israeli general (b. 1926)
  2012   – Chris Economaki, American journalist and sportscaster (b. 1920)
  2012   – Brajesh Mishra, Indian politician and diplomat, 1st Indian National Security Advisor (b. 1928)
2013 – James Emanuel, American-French poet and scholar (b. 1921)
  2013   – Jonathan Fellows-Smith, South African cricketer and rugby player (b. 1932)
  2013   – George Amon Webster, American singer and pianist  (b. 1945)
2014 – Dannie Abse, Welsh physician, poet, and author (b. 1923)
  2014   – Joseph H. Alexander, American colonel and historian (b. 1938)
  2014   – Sheila Faith, English dentist and politician (b. 1928)
  2014   – Tim Rawlings, English footballer and manager (b. 1932)
  2014   – Petr Skoumal, Czech pianist and composer (b. 1938)
2015 – Alexander Faris, Irish composer and conductor (b. 1921)
  2015   – Walter Dale Miller, American rancher and politician, 29th Governor of South Dakota (b. 1925)
  2015   – Ignacio Zoco, Spanish footballer (b. 1939)
2016 – Agnes Nixon, American television writer and director (b. 1922)
  2016   – Gary Glasberg, American television writer and producer (b. 1966)
  2016   – Shimon Peres, Polish-Israeli statesman and politician, 9th President of Israel (b. 1923)
  2016   – Gloria Naylor, American novelist (b. 1950) 
2017 – Daniel Pe'er, Israeli television host and newsreader (b. 1943)
2018 – Predrag Ejdus, Serbian actor (b. 1947)
2019 – José José, Mexican musician and singer (b. 1948)
2022 – Coolio, American rapper (b. 1963)

Holidays and observances
Christian feast day:
Aaron of Auxerre
Annemund
Conval
Eustochium
Exuperius
Faustus of Riez
John of Dukla
Leoba
Lorenzo Ruiz
Paternus of Auch
Richard Rolle, Walter Hilton and Margery Kempe (Episcopal Church (USA)) 
Simón de Rojas
Wenceslas
September 28 (Eastern Orthodox liturgics).
Czech Statehood Day (Czech Republic)
Freedom from Hunger Day 
International Day for Universal Access to Information
National Day of Awareness and Unity against Child Pornography (Philippines)
Teachers' Day (Taiwan and Chinese-Filipino schools in the Philippines), ceremonies dedicated to Confucius are also observed.
World Rabies Day (International)

References

External links

 
 
 

Days of the year
September